Taqueria Los Puñales is a queer-owned and operated Mexican restaurant in Portland, Oregon. Opened by Brian Aster and David Madrigal in 2020, during the COVID-19 pandemic, the restaurant has garnered a generally positive reception.

Description 

Taqueria Los Puñales is a queer-owned and operated Mexican restaurant on Belmont Street in southeast Portland's Sunnyside neighborhood. Named after a gay slur which the business's owners have reclaimed, Brooke Jackson-Glidden of Eater Portland has described Taqueria Los Puñales as "vocally and transparently queer", and Mey Rude of Out Traveler has called the restaurant "unapologetically queer".

The Oregonian's Michael Russell has described the restaurant as "friendly" and "colorful". The interior features prints by queer Mexican artist Felix d'Eon, framed portraits of Mariah Carey, Verónica Castro, Gia Gunn, and Marsha P. Johnson, pennants, and photographs of RuPaul.

The menu includes more than 20 taco options as well as adobada, barbacoa, chile rellenos, guisados, tinga, and house-made tortillas. Drink options include beer, cocktails, margaritas, agua fresca, and Jarritos.

History 
Friends Brian Aster and David Madrigal opened the restaurant in June 2020, during the COVID-19 pandemic, in a space which previously housed a Dick's Kitchen restaurant. Branding and lettering were completed by trans indigenous artist Kennedy Barrera-Cruz and local lesbian artist Shelbee Smith, respectively. According to Out Traveler's Mey Rude, Taqueria Los Puñales is the first and only gay taqueria operating in North America, as of 2020. Sometimes staff distribute stickers which say "Gay Tacos".

Reception 

In 2020, Katherine Chew Hamilton of Portland Monthly called the restaurant a "standout" of the year and wrote, "Taqueria Los Puñales makes some of the best tacos I've had in Portland—I particularly love the choripapas and the barbacoa." Tuck Woodstock and Hamilton included the taqueria in the magazine's 2021 overview of the city's "very best" tacos. Karen Brooks and Hamilton also included Taqueria Los Puñales in the magazine's 2022 list of the city's 50 best restaurants.

In 2021, Bill Oakley said Taqueria Los Puñales was his favorite taco restaurant in Portland. Seiji Nanbu and Brooke Jackson-Glidden included the business in Eater Portland's 2021 list of "15 Outstanding Taco Spots in Portland". The duo wrote, "Los Puñales has easily become a staple taqueria in Portland...  While the classic guisados here are great, the beauty of Los Puñales lies in the more unconventional fillings like the garlicky steak al pesto and fried Chile relleno." In 2022, Nanbu and Krista Garcia included Taqueria Los Puñales in Eater Portland's list of the city's 17 "standout" Mexican restaurants and food carts, and Nanbu and Nathan Williams included the business in a list of "22 Outstanding Taco Spots in Greater Portland".

In 2022, the restaurant was the highest rated in Portland for tacos, based on Yelp ratings and reviews.

See also
 Hispanics and Latinos in Portland, Oregon
 List of Mexican restaurants

References

External links 

 

2020 establishments in Oregon
LGBT culture in Portland, Oregon
Mexican restaurants in Portland, Oregon
Queer culture
Restaurants established in 2020
Sunnyside, Portland, Oregon